Jeff Bradley may refer to:

 Dudley Dudley (wrestler) (Jeff Bradley, born 1968), American wrestler
 Jeff Bradley (cyclist) (born 1961), American racing cyclist
 Jeff Bradley (politician) (born 1957), American politician and a member of the South Carolina House of Representatives